The 2007–08 World Series of Poker Circuit is the 4th annual World Series of Poker Circuit.

Event schedule

Notes 

World Series of Poker Circuit
2008 in poker